Oak Hills may refer to:

Places
In the United States:
 Oak Hills, Monterey County, California 
 Oak Hills, San Bernardino County, California
 Oak Hills, Iowa
 Oak Hills, Oregon
 Oak Hills, Pennsylvania

Schools
 Oak Hills High School, Oak Hills, San Bernardino County, California; see Hesperia Unified School District
 Oak Hills High School, in Cincinnati, Ohio
 Oak Hills Local School District, in Cincinnati, Ohio

See also
 Oak Hill (disambiguation)